State Road 161 in the U.S. State of Indiana is a rural undivided north–south highway in the southwestern portion of the state.

Route description
State Road 161 begins in Spencer County approximately nine miles southwest of Rockport at the northern end of the Owensboro Bridge across the Ohio River in the Ohio Township.  It goes north to Reo. Which passes into Warrick County, where it has concurrencies with State Road 62 and State Road 68.  At the north end of the county it passes over Interstate 64 three times in five miles (8 km), but the only interchange is at the last overpass.  State Road 161 ends in Dubois County at State Road 64 approximately four miles west of Huntingburg.

History

Major intersections

References

External links

161
Transportation in Dubois County, Indiana
Transportation in Spencer County, Indiana
Transportation in Warrick County, Indiana
U.S. Route 231